The Pororoca is a tidal bore, with waves up to  high that travel as much as  inland upstream on the Amazon River and adjacent rivers. Its name might come from the indigenous Tupi language, where it could translate into "great roar". It could be also a Portuguese version of the term poroc-poroc, which in an indigenous' language was a way of expressing the act of destroying everything. It could be also a portmanteau of the words poroc (to take out, to tear away) and oca (house). It occurs at the mouth of the river where its waters meet the Atlantic Ocean.

Explanation

During new and full moons, when the ocean tide is highest, water flows in from the Atlantic, rather than the other way around. The Amazon's flow reverses, the distance of which depends largely on the rainwater-generated outflow of the Amazon, and a water bulge speeds upstream often with great force, forming a tidal bore with an audible noise. The tidal phenomenon is best observed on biannual equinoxes in September and March during a spring tide. On an equinoctial spring tide, the Moon and Sun fall into direct alignment with the Earth, and their gravitational pull is combined, bringing the Pororoca and others around the world to their peak.

Surfing 
The wave has become popular with surfers. Since 1999, an annual championship has been held in São Domingos do Capim (on the adjacent Guamá River). However, surfing the Pororoca is especially dangerous, as the water contains a significant amount of debris from the shores of the river (often entire trees), in addition to dangerous fauna. In 2003 the Brazilian Picuruta Salazar won the event with a record ride of 12.5 km (7.8 mi) lasting 37 minutes.

Notes

External links
 Corran Addison about the Pororoca Wave - Playak.com

Amazon River
Tidal bores
Natural history of South America
River surfing
Surfing locations in Brazil

fr:Amazone (fleuve)#Vague déferlante